Sternolophus is a genus of water scavenger beetles in the family Hydrophilidae containing nine described species in two subgenera.

Species
These nine species belong to the genus Sternolophus:
Subgenus Neosternolophus Zaitzev, 1909:
 Sternolophus angolensis (Erichson, 1843)
 Sternolophus australis Watts, 1989
 Sternolophus immarginatus Orchymont, 1911
 Sternolophus inconspicuus (Nietner, 1856)
 Sternolophus marginicollis (Hope, 1841)
Subgenus Sternolophus Solier, 1834:
 Sternolophus decens Zaitzev, 1909
 Sternolophus rufipes (Fabricius, 1792)
 Sternolophus solieri Castelnau, 1840
 Sternolophus unicolor Castelnau, 1840

References

Hydrophilinae